Crowson is a surname. Notable people with the surname include:

Lamar Crowson (1926–1998), pianist
Lyscum Elbert Crowson (1903–1993), Methodist preacher
Nicholas Crowson, academic historian
Roy Crowson (1914–1999), British entomologist
Tom Crowson, American politician
Woody Crowson (1918–1947), American Major League Baseball pitcher